The women's high jump at the 2017 Asian Athletics Championships was held on 7 July.

Results

References
Results

High
High jump at the Asian Athletics Championships